Benjamin Moser (born September 14, 1976) is an American writer and translator. He received the Pulitzer Prize for his biography of Susan Sontag, titled Sontag: Her Life and Work.

Biography
Born in Houston, Moser attended St. John's School and graduated from Brown University with a degree in history. He came to Brown with the intention of studying Chinese, but soon switched to Portuguese, a choice that would have great influence on his subsequent work. He earned his M.A. and Ph.D. from Utrecht University. He is the brother of author and progressive political activist Laura Moser.

Career and work

Why This World: A Biography of Clarice Lispector

Moser’s first book, Why This World, was published in 2009, and was widely recognized as introducing the Brazilian writer, up until that point largely unknown in the United States, to an international public.

"Despite a cult following of artists and scholars, Lispector has yet to gain her rightful place in the literary canon," wrote Fernanda Eberstadt in The New York Times Book Review. "Benjamin Moser’s lively, ardent and intellectually rigorous biography promises to redress this wrong ... His energetically researched, finely argued biography will surely win Lispector the English-language readership she deserves."

Reviews of the book, which was a finalist for the National Book Critics Circle award, were overwhelmingly positive. “This is rich biographical material that gets only richer as Mr. Moser, a translator and a book critic for Harper’s Magazine, begins to unpeel the layers of her complicated life. Why This World sucks you … into its subject’s strange vortex. … [Moser] is a lucid and very learned tour guide, and his book is a fascinating and welcome introduction to a writer whose best work should be better known in this country,” wrote Dwight Garner in The New York Times.

In The New York Review of Books, Lorrie Moore wrote that the book was “impressively researched ... Well-written and remarkable ... He discusses her work in great detail, book after book, with sympathy and insight, and admirably eschews jargon ... Moser is impressive ... in his interest and take on Brazilian politics. Providing authoritative historical backdrop is his forte.”

The book was translated in many countries and was a bestseller in Brazil.

Autoimperialismo

In 2016, Moser published a book of essays in Portuguese called Autoimperialismo: três ensaios sobre o Brasil (Autoimperialism: Three Essays on Brazil). The book was dedicated to Ocupe Estelita. Ocupe Estelita was an attempt to reclaim Brazilian urban spaces from the corporations that were changing the historic city of Recife, seen as attempts to privatize public space for the benefit of the wealthy. Proceeds from the book were dedicated to the movement. In his book, Moser described the constant violence of Brazilians upon other Brazilians as a form of “autoimperialism.” He described the rhetoric around the construction of the capital of Brasília, the statuary in São Paulo that honors the bandeirantes, and the history of building in Rio de Janeiro that aimed to create a city unconnected to its own past through modern architecture. The book was noted for its harsh criticism of Oscar Niemeyer.

The book received positive reviews and was a bestseller in Brazil.

Sontag: Her Life and Work

In 2013, he was named the authorized biographer of the American writer Susan Sontag. In 2019, he published  Sontag: Her Life and Work, which won the Pulitzer Prize for Biography in 2020. The citation called it "An authoritatively constructed work told with pathos and grace, that captures the writer’s genius and humanity alongside her addictions, sexual ambiguities and volatile enthusiasms.

The book received critical attention from a number of outlets.

In Artforum, Terry Castle wrote: “Benjamin Moser’s Sontag . . . succeeds as it does—magnificently, humanely—by displaying the same intellectual purchase, curiosity, and moral capaciousness to which his subject laid so inspiring and noble a claim over a lifetime. ... Moser’s biography is a stunningly generous gift—to readers, obviously, but also to his subject. He is patient with her, truthful yet tender, recognizing both what was thrilling and what was cursed about her.”

In the Times Literary Supplement, Elaine Showalter wrote: “Engrossing . . . [Sontag] was avid, ardent, driven, generous, narcissistic, Olympian, obtuse, maddening, sometimes loveable but not very likeable. Moser has had the confidence and erudition to bring all these contradictory aspects together in a biography fully commensurate with the scale of his subject. He is also a gifted, compassionate writer.”

In The New Republic, Leslie Jamison wrote: “Utterly riveting and consistently insightful . . . The book takes this larger-than-life intellectual powerhouse—formidable, intimidating, often stubbornly impersonal in her work—and makes her life-size again . . . fascinating.”

In February 2023, it was announced that Kristen Stewart would be playing Sontag in a film adaptation of the book, directed by Kirsten Johnson.

Translation work

Clarice Lispector translation project

Following his publication of Why This World, Moser was named Series Editor at New Directions Publishing for a new translation of the complete works of Clarice Lispector. The ongoing project, which now stretches to eleven volumes, was carried out with a team of translators, with Moser contributing several translations of his own.

The series has been recognized for its contribution toward the increased readership of Lispector. "The revival of the hypnotic Clarice Lispector has been one of the true literary events of the 21st century," wrote Parul Sehgal in The New York Times.

For his work as biographer, editor, and translator of Clarice Lispector, Moser was awarded the Prize for Cultural Diplomacy from the Brazilian Ministry of Foreign Relations in 2016.

Other translation work
In addition to translations from Portuguese, Moser has also published translations from French.

Journalism

Moser served as New Books Columnist for Harper's Magazine from 2009 to 2011, and was a Bookends columnist at The New York Times Book Review.

Moser is currently a Contributing Writer at The Nation.

Personal life

He has lived in France, the Netherlands, and elsewhere. He currently lives in the Netherlands and in France. His partner is the Dutch novelist Arthur Japin.

Awards and honors
2009 National Books Critics Circle Award (Biography) finalist for Why This World
2014 Nona Balakian Citation for Excellence in Reviewing finalist
 2016 Prêmio Itamaraty de Diplomacia Cultural
 2017 Guggenheim Fellowship
 2020 Pulitzer Prize for Biography or Autobiography for Sontag: Her Life and Work
2021 Sócio Correspondente of the

Bibliography

Author 

 Benjamin Moser, Why This World: A Biography of Clarice Lispector, Oxford University Press (2009)/Haus Publishing Limited,  (US), 978-1906598426 (UK)
 Benjamin Moser, Clarice, uma biografia, Cosac Naify (2009).
 Benjamin Moser, Autoimperialismo: três ensaios sobre o Brasil, Planeta, 2016
 Benjamin Moser, Sontag: Her Life and Work, Ecco 2019.
 Benjamin Moser, Frans Hals op de tweesprong, Arbeiderspers, 2020.

Editor and translator for Clarice Lispector 

  Clarice Lispector, The Hour of the Star, trans. Benjamin Moser. New Directions (2011)  (US).
 Clarice Lispector, Água Viva, trans. Stefan Tobler. New Directions (2012)  (US)
 Clarice Lispector, A Breath of Life, trans. Johnny Lorenz. New Directions (2012)  (US)
 Clarice Lispector, Near to the Wild Heart, trans. Alison Entrekin. New Directions (2012)  (US)
 Clarice Lispector, The Passion According to G.H., trans. Idra Novey. New Directions (2012)  (US)
 Clarice Lispector, The Complete Stories, trans. Katrina Dodson. New Directions (2015)  (US)
 Clarice Lispector, The Chandelier, trans. Benjamin Moser and Magdalena Edwards. New Directions (2018)  (US)
 Clarice Lispector, The Besieged City, trans. Johnny Lorenz. New Directions (2019)  (US)
 Clarice Lispector, An Apprenticeship or the Book of Pleasures, trans. Stefan Tobler. New Directions (2020). 
 Clarice Lispector, The Woman Who Killed the Fish, trans. Benjamin Moser. New Directions (2022).

Other translations
Luiz Alfredo Garcia-Roza, Pursuit: An Inspector Espinosa Mystery, trans. Benjamin Moser. Macmillan (2006)   
Luiz Alfredo Garcia-Roza,  Southwesterly Wind: An Inspector Espinosa Mystery, trans. Benjamin Moser. (2004)   
Luiz Alfredo Garcia-Roza, December Heat: An Inspector Espinosa Mystery, trans. Benjamin Moser. Macmillan (2004)                                  
Luiz Alfredo Garcia-Roza, The Silence of the Rain: An Inspector Espinosa Mystery, trans. Benjamin Moser. Macmillan (2003)   
Bernard-Henri Lévy, Left in Dark Times: A Stand Against the New Barbarism, trans. Benjamin Moser. Random House Publishing Group (2008)

Reviews
 Reviews

References

External links

 
 
 Interview in Vanity Fair
 Review of Why This World in the New York Times Book Review
 Interview in the New York Times
 Interview in the Sunday Times (London)
 Interview in Texas Monthly
 Interview in O Estado de S. Paulo (in Portuguese)
 Interview in Ha'aretz (in Hebrew)

1976 births
21st-century American male writers
21st-century American non-fiction writers
American biographers
American columnists
American expatriates in France
American expatriates in Italy
American expatriates in the Netherlands
Brazilianists
Brown University alumni
Dutch–English translators
French–English translators
Harper's Magazine people
Jewish American writers
Journalists from Texas
Living people
Portuguese–English translators
Pulitzer Prize for Biography or Autobiography winners
Spanish–English translators
St. John's School (Texas) alumni
Translators of Clarice Lispector
Utrecht University alumni
Writers from Houston
21st-century American translators
21st-century American Jews